Coralwood is a common name for several plants and may refer to:

Adenanthera pavonina and sometimes Adenanthera microsperma, trees from Southeast Asia and India
Ormosia krugii, a tree from Haiti, Puerto Rico
Pterocarpus soyauxii, an African tree

See also
Coral tree